The McNeely Creek Bridge is a historic bridge spanning McNeely Creek just outside Beirne, Arkansas, a village in southwestern Clark County.

The bridge was listed on the National Register of Historic Places in 2004.  It was delisted in 2022.

See also
National Register of Historic Places listings in Clark County, Arkansas
List of bridges on the National Register of Historic Places in Arkansas

References

Road bridges on the National Register of Historic Places in Arkansas
Bridges completed in 1923
National Register of Historic Places in Clark County, Arkansas
Steel bridges in the United States
Warren truss bridges in the United States
1923 establishments in Arkansas
Transportation in Clark County, Arkansas
Former National Register of Historic Places in Arkansas